The Roman Catholic Diocese of Puno is a diocese located in the city of Puno in the Ecclesiastical province of Arequipa in Peru.

History
7 October 1861: Established as Diocese of Puno from the Diocese of Cusco

Leadership
 Bishops of Puno (Roman rite), in reverse chronological order
 Bishop Jorge Pedro Carrión Pavlich (since 25 March 2000)
 Bishop Jesús Mateo Calderón Barrueto, O.P. (3 November 1972 – 14 February 1998)
 Bishop Julio González Ruiz, S.D.B. (2 March 1959 – 1 July 1972)
 Bishop Alberto Maria Dettmann y Aragón, O.P. (28 June 1948 – 6 February 1959), appointed Bishop of Ica
 Bishop Salvador Herrera y Pinto, O.F.M. (21 December 1933 – 5 April 1948)
 Bishop Fedel María Cosió y Medyna (7 January 1923 – 14 May 1933)
 Bishop Valentín Ampuero, C.M. (16 March 1909 – 30 September 1914)
 Bishop Ismael Puyrredón (14 February 1889 – 28 August 1907), appointed Titular Archbishop after resignation
 Bishop Juan Capistrano Estévanes, O.F.M. (23 March 1880 – 1 October 1880)
 Bishop Pedro José Chávez (25 July 1875 – 11 March 1879)
 Bishop Juan María Ambrosio Huerta (2 November 1864 – 1873)
 Bishop Mariano Chacón Becerra (17 June 1861 – 1864)

See also
Roman Catholicism in Peru

Sources
 GCatholic.org
 Catholic Hierarchy

Roman Catholic dioceses in Peru
Roman Catholic Ecclesiastical Province of Arequipa
Religious organizations established in 1861
Roman Catholic dioceses and prelatures established in the 19th century
1861 establishments in Peru